Gallia Celtica, meaning "Celtic Gaul" in Latin, was a cultural region of Gaul inhabited by Celts, located in what is now France, Switzerland, Luxembourg and the west bank of the Rhine in Germany.

According to the Roman ethnography and Julius Caesar in his narrative Commentaries on the Gallic War, Gaul was divided into three main regions: Belgica, Aquitania and Celtica. The inhabitants of Belgica were called Belgae, those of Aquitania were called Aquitani. The inhabitants of the Celtica region called themselves Celts in their own language, and were later called Galli by Julius Caesar:

A similar definition is given by Pliny the Elder:

Notes

Cultural regions
Pre-Roman Gaul
Ancient history of France
Ancient Switzerland
History of Germany
History of Luxembourg